Hodenpijl is a hamlet in the Dutch province of South Holland. It is located 3 km southwest of the centre of Delft, in the municipality of Midden-Delfland.

Hodenpijl was a separate municipality between 1817 and 1855, when it merged with Schipluiden.

References

Populated places in South Holland
Former municipalities of South Holland
Midden-Delfland